Connor William Sadzeck (born October 1, 1991) is an American professional baseball pitcher in the Minnesota Twins organization. He has previously played in Major League Baseball (MLB) for the Texas Rangers, Seattle Mariners, and Milwaukee Brewers.

Career

Amateur career
Sadzeck attended Crystal Lake Central High School in Crystal Lake, Illinois, and played for the school's baseball team. The Pittsburgh Pirates selected Sadzeck in the 45th round of the 2010 Major League Baseball draft. He did not sign and attended Howard College. He was then drafted by the Texas Rangers in the 11th round of the 2011 MLB draft and signed for a $350,000 signing bonus.

Minor leagues
Sadzeck made his professional debut in 2012 with the Spokane Indians and he spent the whole season there, going 1–4 with a 4.06 earned run average (ERA) in 15 games. He spent 2013 with the Hickory Crawdads where he compiled a 12–4 record, 2.25 ERA, and a 1.16 WHIP in 24 starts. He missed the 2014 season after undergoing Tommy John surgery. Sadzeck spent 2015 with both the High Desert Mavericks and Frisco RoughRiders, posting a combined 3–2 record and 5.82 ERA in 60.1 innings pitched.

The Rangers added him to their 40-man roster after the 2015 season. In 2016, he played for Frisco where he was 10–8 with a 4.16 ERA in 25 games (23 starts), and in 2017, he once again pitched for Frisco, going 4–8 with a 6.25 ERA in 38 games (13 starts). He spent the 2018 minor league season with the Round Rock Express, going 5–3 with a 4.03 ERA in 38 innings.

Texas Rangers
Sadzeck made his MLB debut on September 1, 2018. He pitched in 13 major league games in 2018, posting a 0.96 ERA, 7 strikeouts, and 11 walks in 9 innings. Sadzeck used his third and final minor league option during the 2018 season. On March 28, 2019, he was designated for assignment by the Rangers.

Seattle Mariners
On April 1, 2019, Sadzeck was traded to the Seattle Mariners in exchange for Grant Anderson. He was outrighted off of the Mariners roster on October 28.

Chicago White Sox
On February 25, 2020, Sadzeck signed a minor league deal with the Chicago White Sox. He was released on August 3, 2021 after he played in 23 games in AAA and was 2–2 with a 5.86 ERA.

Milwaukee Brewers
On August 11, 2021 Sadzeck signed a minor league deal with the Milwaukee Brewers. He was assigned to the Triple-A Nashville Sounds. On July 13, 2022, Sadzeck was selected by the Brewers. On July 25, 2022, Sadzeck was designated for assignment. On July 30, 2022, Sadzeck elected free agency.

Washington Nationals
On August 4, 2022, Sadzeck signed a minor league deal with the Washington Nationals. Sadzeck pitched in 17 games for the Triple-A Rochester Red Wings, posting an 0-3 record and 3.86 ERA with 21 strikeouts in 21.0 innings of work. He elected free agency on November 10, 2022.

Minnesota Twins
On February 10, 2023, Sadzeck signed a minor league contract with the Minnesota Twins organization.

References

External links

1991 births
Living people
People from Barrington, Illinois
Baseball players from Illinois
Major League Baseball pitchers
Texas Rangers players
Seattle Mariners players
Milwaukee Brewers players
Howard Hawks baseball players
Arizona League Rangers players
Spokane Indians players
Hickory Crawdads players
High Desert Mavericks players
Frisco RoughRiders players
Surprise Saguaros players
Round Rock Express players
Tigres del Licey players
American expatriate baseball players in the Dominican Republic
Charlotte Knights players
Nashville Sounds players